Çanaqçı or Chanakhchi or Chanakhchy or Chenakhchi may refer to:
Chanakhchi, Armenia
Zangakatun, Armenia 
Çanaqçı, Dashkasan, Azerbaijan
Çanaqçı, Gadabay, Azerbaijan
Çanaqçı, Khojali, Azerbaijan